Formed in 1979, the Potomac Valley Athletic Conference is a group of independent schools in the Washington metropolitan area who compete against each other in interscholastic athletics. The conference comprises small independent schools from Maryland and the District of Columbia.

Member schools 
Full members

Former members 

Covenant Life School
Georgetown Day School (1979-1998)
Grace Brethren Christian School (?-2018)
Montrose Christian School
Queen Anne School (1979-2011)
The Potomac School 
Oakcrest School (1979-2019)
St. Andrew's Episcopal School (1979-1998)

Soccer divisions
The PVAC was divided into two divisions for soccer, with the goal of improving competitive balance. However, in 2017 the PVAC combined the two divisions.

PVAC Boys Varsity Soccer consists of the following teams:

The Field School
Sandy Spring Friends School
St. Anselm's Abbey School
Washington International School
Charles E. Smith Jewish Day School
Washington Christian Academy
Grace Brethren Christian School
McLean School of Maryland
Melvin J. Berman Hebrew Academy
Washington Waldorf
Edmund Burke School

PVAC champions

Boys soccer

*No regular season champion was declared in 2002 when the season was shortened due to the DC-area sniper incident. Sandy Spring Friends School finished in first place in the abbreviated regular season.

Other sports

Boys varsity basketball
 2003-St. Anselm's Abbey
 2004-Charles E. Smith Jewish Day School
 2005-Berman Hebrew Academy
2006 St. Anselm's Abbey 
 2007-St. Anselm's Abbey 
 2008-The Field School
 2009-Washington International School
 2010-Covenant Life School
 2011-Covenant Life School
 2012-Grace Brethren Christian School
 2013-McLean School
 2014-Covenant Life School
 2015-Grace Brethren Christian School
 2016-Sandy Spring Friends School
 2017-Charles E. Smith Jewish Day School
 2018-Sandy Spring Friends School
 2019-St. Anselm's Abbey
 2022-Sandy Spring Friends School

Girls varsity volleyball
 1998-Covenant Life
 1999-Hebrew Academy
 2000-Covenant Life
 2001-Covenant Life
 2002-Covenant Life
 2003-Covenant Life
 2004-Covenant Life
 2005-Covenant Life
 2006-Covenant Life
 2007-Covenant Life
 2008-Covenant Life
 2009-Covenant Life
 2010-Covenant Life
 2011-Covenant Life
 2012-Covenant Life
 2013-Washington International School
 2014-Washington International School
 2015-Covenant Life
 2016-Washington International School
 2017-Washington International School

Boys varsity baseball
 2002-Charles E. Smith Jewish Day School
 2003-St. Anselm's Abbey
 2004-St. Anselm's Abbey
 2005-Charles E. Smith Jewish Day School
 2006-St. Anselm's Abbey
 2007-Charles E. Smith Jewish Day School
 2008-St. Anselm's Abbey
 2009-Charles E. Smith Jewish Day School
 2010-St. Anselm's Abbey
 2011-St. Anselm's Abbey
 2012-Charles E. Smith Jewish Day School
 2013-The Field School
 2014-The Field School
 2015-Sandy Spring Friends School
 2016-Sandy Spring Friends School
 2017-St. Anselm's Abbey
 2018-St. Anselm's Abbey
 2022-St. Anselm's Abbey

Boys varsity track
2006 - Grace Brethren
2007 - Grace Brethren
2008 - The Field School
2009 - Edmund Burke
2010 - St. Anselm's
2011 - St. Anselm's and The Field School tied
2012 - The Field School
2013 - The Field School
2014 - The Field School
2015 - The Field School
2016 - The Field School
2017 - The Field School
2018 - The Field School
2019 - Edmund Burke School

College Athletics
Despite its low profile, the PVAC has sent athletes to many high-profile Division I schools such as UNC, University of Louisville, Davidson, Navy, Elon University, and Cornell University. There are many PVAC graduates playing at Division III schools.

References 

High school sports associations in the United States